Kenneth Joseph Matthews, MBE (21 June 1934 – 2 June 2019) was a British race walker, who won the Olympic (1964) and European (1962) titles in the 20 km walk.

From 1957 Matthews worked as an electrician at a local power plant at Hams Hall near Sutton Coldfield and had to take a paid leave for competitions. In 1959, 1961, 1963 and 1964 he won the British titles in all three walking events. He took part in the 1960 Olympics, but failed to finish the 20 km race. He won the same event at the 1964 Games in a new Olympic record of 1.29:34. He was the only one of the four gold medallists from Great Britain who was not appointed a Member of the Most Excellent Order of the British Empire (MBE) soon afterwards in recognition of his achievement. Following a public outcry, he belatedly received the honours, for services to race walking, in the 1977 Silver Jubilee and Birthday Honours.

Matthews also won the European title in 1962 and twice the Lugano Trophy (1961 and 1963).

In 2007, he was the guest of honour at Hawarden High School for the Year 11 Record Of Achievement. In 2011, he was inducted into the England Athletics Hall of Fame.

He died on 2 June 2019, aged 84. An inquest concluded in early January 2020 that his death was the result of an unknown allergic reaction.

References

External links

 Ken Matthews at UK Athletics
 Ken Matthews at the European Athletic Association
 

1934 births
2019 deaths
Sportspeople from Birmingham, West Midlands
British male racewalkers
English male racewalkers
Olympic athletes of Great Britain
Olympic gold medallists for Great Britain
Athletes (track and field) at the 1960 Summer Olympics
Athletes (track and field) at the 1964 Summer Olympics
English Olympic medallists
Members of the Order of the British Empire
European Athletics Championships medalists
Medalists at the 1964 Summer Olympics
Olympic gold medalists in athletics (track and field)
World Athletics Race Walking Team Championships winners